Yordan Yanev (born July 29, 1954) is a retired Bulgarian long jumper.

Achievements

References

1954 births
Living people
Bulgarian male long jumpers
Athletes (track and field) at the 1980 Summer Olympics
Olympic athletes of Bulgaria